Khoonkar Darinde is a Hindi low budget horror film of Bollywood directed by Teerat Singh and produced by Ajay Kumar. This film was released on 22 October 1999 in the banner of Atlanta productions.

Plot
This is a revenge story of a man who was killed and returns as a devil.

Cast
 Shakti Kapoor
 Deepak Shirke
 Sapna
 Joginder
 Shiva Rindani
 Vinod Tripathi
 Meghna

References

External links
 

1999 films
1990s Hindi-language films
Indian horror films
1999 horror films
Hindi-language horror films